Honeycomb tube worm may refer to:

 Honeycomb worm (Sabellaria alveolata)
 Sandcastle worm (Phragmatopoma californica)

Animal common name disambiguation pages